Ailill mac Áedo Róin (died 639) was a king of the Uí Failge, a Laigin people of County Offaly. He was the son of Áed Rón mac Cathail (died 604), a previous king. 

He is listed as king in the Book of Leinster king list and is also mentioned in a poem in the genealogies about the royal fort at Rathangan, County Kildare. He may have ruled from 604 to 639.

The annals only record his death date. Future kings were to descend from his uncle Máel Uma.

Notes

See also
 Kings of Ui Failghe

References

 Byrne, Francis John (2001), Irish Kings and High-Kings, Dublin: Four Courts Press, 
 Mac Niocaill, Gearoid (1972), Ireland before the Vikings, Dublin: Gill and Macmillan

External links
CELT: Corpus of Electronic Texts at University College Cork

People from County Offaly
639 deaths
7th-century Irish monarchs
Year of birth unknown